Hankinson is a surname. Notable people with the surname include:

 Ben Hankinson (born 1969), retired American ice hockey player
 Casey Hankinson (born 1976), former professional American ice hockey player
 Donald Hankinson (1832–1877), New Zealand politician who represented the Riverton electorate
 Drew Hankinson (born 1983), American professional wrestler
 Frank Hankinson (1856–1911), American baseball player
 Fred Hankinson (1925–1997), Australian politician
 Mel Hankinson (born 1943), men's basketball coach and author
 Phil Hankinson (1951–1996), American basketball player
 Sean Hankinson (born 1980s), American actor
 Tim Hankinson (born 1955), American soccer coach

See also
 Hankinson (disambiguation)